Tarick Johnson (born 1 December 1981 in [Lakenheath, England) is a professional American/British basketball player who sports a 45 inch vertical jump and played for APOEL in Cyprus. In which he won cup title.

During the 2009-2010 season he played for CB Tarragona Tarragona 2017,in Spain after a season with Gijón Baloncesto, Spain in 2008, which he was top scorer of league at 21.0 PPG. Previously he played for CB L'Hospitalet in Spain, after a spell with London United basketball London, United.

Tarick joined London United in 2006 and lead the BBL league in scoring at 25PPG after spells with Eisbaeren Bremerhaven in the German 1. Bundesliga and won title as rookie and had spell in Landstede Zwolle in the Netherlands' Premier League. Tarick is a member of Great Britain national basketball team and has also represented England at the University level in the World University Games whilst at Campbell University in the NCAA Men's Division I Basketball Championship NCAA I.

References

1981 births
Living people
British Basketball League players
Campbell Fighting Camels basketball players
People from Lakenheath
Greek Basket League players
Rethymno B.C. players
APOEL B.C. players
Gijón Baloncesto players
CB Tarragona players
CB L'Hospitalet players